Jason Hedstrand (born September 22, 1975) is an American speed skater. He competed in the men's 10,000 metres event at the 2002 Winter Olympics.

References

External links
 

1975 births
Living people
American male speed skaters
Olympic speed skaters of the United States
Speed skaters at the 2002 Winter Olympics
Sportspeople from Michigan